Gerald Dobbs (born 24 January 1971) is an English former football midfielder. He started his career with Wimbledon, scoring a solitary goal in 33 league appearances, then in 1995 had a loan spell with Cardiff City and moved to Conference side Dover Athletic. After 2 seasons he moved to Ireland, where he played for Cork City and Cobh Ramblers.

References

Since 1888... The Searchable Premiership and Football League Player Database (subscription required)

1971 births
Living people
Footballers from the London Borough of Lambeth
English footballers
Association football midfielders
Wimbledon F.C. players
Cardiff City F.C. players
Dover Athletic F.C. players
Cork City F.C. players
Cobh Ramblers F.C. players
English Football League players
Premier League players
National League (English football) players
League of Ireland players